The Itawamba Community College Indians are 11 teams representing Itawamba Community College in intercollegiate athletics, including men and women's basketball, soccer, and tennis. Men's sports include baseball, football, and golf. Women's sports include softball and volleyball. The Indians compete in the NJCAA Region XXIII and are members of the Mississippi Association of Community & Junior Colleges.

Teams

Baseball

ICC has had 19 Major League Baseball draft selections since the draft began in 1965.

References

External links
 

College sports teams in Mississippi